Paul Borghgraef (born 13 July 1954) is a Belgian businessman. He is a son of Theo Borghgraef and Suzanne Collin, who is a daughter of Fernand Collin. He is a member of the board of directors of the KBC Group.

Early life
He obtained a degree in Accounting and Fiscal Studies and a postgraduate degree in computer science and social legislation from the Economische Hogeschool in Antwerp.

Career
He was formerly Managing Director of Krefima and Concentra, and Director of Kredietbank S.A. Luxembourgeoise. He is chairman of the board of directors of Retail Estates. He was appointed director of Almanij in 2000 and became a member of its Management Committee in 2001. In 2005, Almanij merged with KBC to form the KBC Group, he became a member of the board of the new group.

References

1954 births
Belgian businesspeople
Living people